Tiantai Temple, may refer to:

 Tiantai Temple (Mount Jiuhua), on Mount Jiuhua, in Qingyang County, Anhui, China
 Tiantai Temple (Shijiazhuang), in Gaocheng District of Shijiazhuang, Hebei, China
 Tiantai Temple (Handan), in Feixiang District of Handan, Hebei, China
 Tiantai Temple (Chongqing), in Changshou District of Chongqing, China
 Tiantai Temple (Hong'an County), in Hong'an County, Hubei, China
 Tiantai Temple (Kazuo County), in Kazuo County, Liaoning, China